Los Angeles FC is an American professional soccer team based in Los Angeles, California, that competes in Major League Soccer (MLS).

This is a list of franchise records for Los Angeles, which dates from their inaugural season in 2018 to present.

Honors

Player records

Most appearances 

Bolded players are currently on the LAFC roster.

Goals

Bolded players are currently on the LAFC roster.

Most Assists 

Bolded players are currently on the LAFC roster.

Most shutouts 

Bolded players are currently on the LAFC roster.

Coaching records

List of seasons

International results

By competition
 (Includes CONCACAF Champions League)

By club
 (Includes CONCACAF Champions League)

By country and league
 (Includes CONCACAF Champions League)

By season

Transfers
As per MLS rules and regulations; some transfer fees have been undisclosed and are not included in the tables below.

Highest transfer fees paid

Highest transfer fees received

References

Los Angeles FC
Los Angeles FC records and statistics
Los Angeles FC